Karin Ågesen  is a Danish orienteer.
She competed at the first European Orienteering Championships in 1962, where she placed 8th in the individual contest and fourth in the unofficial relay with the Danish team.
She won a bronze medal in the relay with the Danish team at the 1964 European Orienteering Championships in Le Brassus.

At the 1966 World Orienteering Championships in Fiskars, Finland, she placed 22nd in the individual contest, and also competed with the Danish relay team.

References

Year of birth missing (living people)
Living people
Danish orienteers
Foot orienteers